Miro Rahkola is a Finnish professional ice hockey defenceman who currently plays for the Varberg Vipers of the Swedish Tier 3 league, Hockeyettan.

References

External links

Living people
Ässät players
1988 births
Finnish ice hockey defencemen
Sportspeople from Pori